The representative of Peru to Central America was the official representative of the Peruvian Republic to Central America, an umbrella term for the countries located in the region of the same name.

History
The term "Central America" was an umbrella term used by the Peruvian Ministry of Foreign Affairs for the countries located in the region between Mexico and Colombia. After the Separation of Panama from Colombia in 1903, Peru established relations with said state on December of the same year, and the legations in Central America and Panama were merged in 1905.

The establishment of relations between Peru and the countries in the region first took place in the 1850s, when Peru sent diplomat Pedro Gálvez Egúsquiza on a mission to establish relations with the countries of the region during the Filibuster War, including neighbouring New Granada and Venezuela. The umbrella representation was phased out in the 1930s, as Peruvian diplomats began to be appointed to the countries themselves instead of the entire region, and the legations of Panama and Central America were separated in 1939.

The countries represented under the name "Central America" were as follows:
 (1896–1898)

 (from 1905)

As of 2023, Peru is diplomatically represented to each country individually at an embassy level, including, since 1991, an accreditation to Belize from its ambassador in El Salvador.

List of representatives

See also
List of ambassadors of Peru to Costa Rica
List of ambassadors of Peru to El Salvador
List of ambassadors of Peru to Guatemala
List of ambassadors of Peru to Honduras
List of ambassadors of Peru to Nicaragua
List of ambassadors of Peru to Panama

References

Central America
Politics of Central America